Águilas Verdes de Guadalupe  is an Equatoguinean football club who plays in the Equatoguinean Premier League.

The club is based in Bata, Equatorial Guinea in Litoral Province (Equatorial Guinea).

Kits
The club plays in green kits

References

External links

Football clubs in Equatorial Guinea